Jade Mountain may refer to:

Jade Mountain (mythology), mythological mountain in Chinese mythology
Jade Mountain (North Slope Borough, Alaska), mountain in Alaska
Jade Mountains, a small offshoot range of the larger Baird Mountains
Yu Shan, also known as Jade Mountain, the highest mountain in Taiwan

See also
Jade Dragon Snow Mountain
Jade Mountain Illustrating the Gathering of Scholars at the Lanting Pavilion
Temple of the Jade Mountain
Yushan (disambiguation)